East London railway station is the central railway station in the city of East London in the Eastern Cape province of South Africa. It is the terminus for Shosholoza Meyl inter-city trains to Johannesburg and Cape Town, and of a Metrorail commuter service to Mdantsane and Berlin.

East London station is located along Station Road on the edge of the city's central business district. It is laid out as a terminal station, with five tracks for passenger trains.

East London, Eastern Cape
Transport in the Eastern Cape
Metrorail (South Africa) stations
Shosholoza Meyl stations
Buildings and structures in the Eastern Cape